The NAIA Women's Wrestling Championship is an annual tournament hosted by the National Association of Intercollegiate Athletics to determine the national champion of collegiate women's wrestling among its members in the United States.

The tournament consists of both a team national title and individual titles at various weight classes. The inaugural edition of the tournament was held in 2021.

The reigning national champions are Campbellsville, who won their second title in 2022.

Results

Team titles

See also
NCAA Wrestling Championships (Division I, Division II, Division III)

References

External links
NAIA Women's Wrestling

Wrestling